John M. Pierce House is a historic home located near Crumpler, Ashe County, North Carolina.  The original log section was built about 1871. A one-story frame ell was added to the rear about 1881, and in 1892, the log house was raised to a full two stories and a large two-story addition was built. The front facade features a two-story engaged porch.  Also on the property is a contributing barn (c. 1883).

It was listed on the National Register of Historic Places in 1976.

References

Log houses in the United States
Houses on the National Register of Historic Places in North Carolina
Houses completed in 1871
Houses in Ashe County, North Carolina
National Register of Historic Places in Ashe County, North Carolina
Log buildings and structures on the National Register of Historic Places in North Carolina